Windigo is a Canadian drama film, directed by Robert Morin and released in 1994. Partially based on Joseph Conrad's novel Heart of Darkness, the film centres on a First Nations group in rural northern Quebec who have declared independence from Canada, and a journalist from Montreal who travels to their territory to cover the story.

The cast includes Donald Morin, Guy Nadon, Yvon Leroux, Richard Kistabish and Serge Houde.

The film premiered at the 1994 Toronto International Film Festival, where it received an honorable mention from the jury for the Best Canadian Film award. It went into commercial release in November 1994.

The film was one of six finalists for the Rendez-vous du cinéma québécois's Prix L.-E. Ouimet-Molson in 1995.

References

External links

1994 films
Canadian drama films
Films shot in Quebec
Films directed by Robert Morin
First Nations films
Films based on works by Joseph Conrad
Works based on Heart of Darkness
French-language Canadian films
1990s Canadian films